A rózsa énekei is a 2003 film about Holocaust victims in Hungary during World War II.

Plot
Autumn 1944. Yellow star, ghettos, Arrow Cross terror. The inhabitants of Hungary's capital, Budapest, await the tragic fulfilment of their fate with helpless resignation. However, above one of the city's villas, once a week in the evening the stars of hope sparkle, if only for a few minutes. This short time gives fresh heart to those hiding here and kindles hope in their tortured souls to live for another day. This mysterious power is none other than a beautiful song that can be heard at such times from the villa's tower room. Géza Halász, the villa's always jovial caretaker, believes no Jew has reason to fear while the owner of the voice, Imre Rose, the world-famous opera singer and a Jew himself, remains in Budapest and does not flee from the country in spite of his American, British, Swiss, Swedish and Vatican connections. Halász visits the singer every Friday to dine with him. After a while the marvellous, hope-inspiring concert starts, which is listened to by the hiding inhabitants of the house with enraptured faces through the villa's open dumb waiter. Already in the "palmy years of peacetime" Rose had competed with Csortos, the famous actor, for the title of "Budapest's Greatest Misanthrope". Thus it does not surprise anybody that the eccentric singer never, not even once, tries to make contact with his fellow Jews who took refuge in his house. And when Halász recounts that the singer swore within an hour of the Arrow Cross's seizing power that he would not utter a single word nor cross the threshold of his tower room until "Andrássy Avenue has been purged of this Arrow Cross scum", even the slightest suspicion about Rose's "invisibility" vanishes. Only a fourteen-year-old boy, Tommy, the caretaker's son, listens to the weekly song with curiosity combined with suspicion, and tries to find out about the secret of the tower room. As a result of the adolescent's persistent and undaunted inquiries, the opera singer's mystery is unveiled. Meanwhile, however, almost unnoticed, the events of the calamitous days, filled with excitement and cheerfulness, turn the boy into a truly adult man. The story of THE SONGS OF RÓZSA is based on true events.

Reception
A rózsa énekei received a Special Jury Mention at the Karlovy Vary International Film Festival in 2003.

References

External links
Official website
 

2003 films
Hungarian war drama films
2000s Hungarian-language films
Hungarian World War II films